Otmara Marrero is an American actress. She is known for the NBC series Connecting...,  2019's Clementine, and Crackle's 2016 series StartUp.

Early life
Marrero was born in Miami, Florida, to a Cuban American family, and raised in Hialeah. She was a dancer for the Miami Marlins.

Career
Marrero's first onscreen role was a small part in a season 3 episode of USA Network's Graceland. Her performance in Damian Fitzsimmons' Off the Rails earned her a Commendation award at the Liverpool International Film Festival, while she  won a breakthrough award at the Downtown LA film festival for her performance in Clementine. She filmed her part in Connecting... at home.

Filmography
 Florida Man – TBA
Jackass Forever 2022
Connecting... 2020
Clementine 2019
Off The Rails 2018
StartUp 2016—2018

References

External links

American entertainers of Cuban descent
Actresses from Miami
Miami Marlins personnel
1989 births
Living people
People from Hialeah, Florida
Hispanic and Latino American actresses
21st-century American women